Alexis Bravo (born September 15, 1984) is an Argentinian footballer.

External links
 
 

1984 births
Living people
Footballers from Buenos Aires
Argentine footballers
Argentine expatriate footballers
Club San José players
Club Real Potosí players
C.D. Jorge Wilstermann players
Atlético Tucumán footballers
Central Córdoba de Santiago del Estero footballers
Concepción Fútbol Club players
Centauros Villavicencio footballers
Sportivo Patria footballers
Guabirá players
Universitario de Sucre footballers
Club Atlético Mitre footballers
Club Independiente Petrolero players
Torneo Argentino A players
Torneo Argentino B players
Primera Nacional players
Bolivian Primera División players
Categoría Primera A players
Association football midfielders
Argentine expatriate sportspeople in Bolivia
Argentine expatriate sportspeople in Colombia
Expatriate footballers in Bolivia
Expatriate footballers in Colombia